T. J. Clark (born February 25, 1962) is a former NASCAR driver. He was a fixture on the Craftsman Truck Series tour during its early years.

Clark made the inaugural CTS race in 1995, qualifying the No. 23 Team ASE Racing Ford in the 29th position, finishing 32nd by a crash. Clark ended up only making 13 races of the 20-race schedule. It was not even until the 9th race of the year at Bristol that Clark could manage to finish a race (21st). Overall, his best finish was 12th at Martinsville, and finished 21st in points.

Before 1996, Clark lost ASE to Ultra Motorsports and only made sixteen of the twenty-four races. He matched his career-best of 12th twice: at Phoenix and Mesa Marin. He also had five other top-20 finishes. and finished 22nd in the points. Clark made two starts in 1997 as his career came to a close due to funding, finishing of 26th at Phoenix and 28th at Evergreen Speedway. He has not raced since.

Motorsports career results

NASCAR
(key) (Bold – Pole position awarded by qualifying time. Italics – Pole position earned by points standings or practice time. * – Most laps led.)

Craftsman Truck Series

Winston West Series

References

External links
 
 

1962 births
Living people
NASCAR drivers
NASCAR team owners
Sportspeople from Chandler, Arizona
Racing drivers from Arizona
Racing drivers from Phoenix, Arizona